Ou Island (奥武島, Ōjima) is a small islet located in the Okinawa Islands of Japan. It's administered by the town of Nanjō, and a bridge connects both entities.

The island is known for its abundance of seafood due to Ōjima being a fishing village. The Hari, a dragon boat racing festival, is performed there.

References 

Okinawa Islands